Lindauer is a German surname. Notable people with the surname include:

 Charles Frederick Lindauer (1836–1921), named in the Lexow Committee hearings on New York City police corruption as a policy racket dealer
 Gottfried Lindauer (1839–1926), Czech-New Zealand artist
Janez Lindauer, 16th-century Slovene politician
 John Howard Lindauer (born 1937), American economist, media businessman and politician, former chancellor of the University of Alaska Anchorage
 Martin Lindauer (1918–2008)
 Sophia Lindauer (1830–1909), mother of Arthur Hays Sulzberger
 Susan Lindauer (born 1963), American journalist and peace activist accused by the United States government as an unregistered agent of Iraq, daughter of John Lindauer
 Victor Wilhelm Lindauer (1888–1964), a phycologist from New Zealand with the standard author abbreviation "Lindauer"

German-language surnames